Jan Bo Petersen  (born 28 July 1970) is a Danish former cyclist. He won the bronze medal in the Men's team pursuit in the 1992 Summer Olympics.

References 

1970 births
Living people
Cyclists at the 1992 Summer Olympics
Cyclists at the 1996 Summer Olympics
Danish male cyclists
Olympic bronze medalists for Denmark
Olympic cyclists of Denmark
Olympic medalists in cycling
Medalists at the 1992 Summer Olympics
People from Næstved
Sportspeople from Region Zealand